Matt Hodgson (born ) is an Australian sports administrator and former professional rugby union player for the Western Force and the Wallabies, the Australian national team. He is currently head of rugby at Global Rapid Rugby which launched its Asia-Pacific Showcase competition in 2019.

During his rugby career Hodgson won eleven caps for Australia and was the first Western Force player to earn 100 caps for the club. He captained the Force for many years, including in 2014 when the club had the most successful season in their Super Rugby history with nine wins. Hodgson's leadership and playing form in that season earned him a recall to the Wallabies for the test series against France.

Career

Hodgson began his rugby career with his local team the Avoca Sharks in the NSW Central Coast town of Avoca Beach. At age 17, Hodgson was drafted by the New South Wales Waratahs as a flyhalf/centre and was redeveloped as a loose forward. However, he did not receive any Super Rugby caps for the franchise in that season, which saw him leave the club to represent amateur clubs to develop into a full-time flanker. While training with the Waratahs, Hodgson played for Sydney Club Rugby teams Eastwood Rugby Club (1999–2003) and Manly RUFC (2004–05). His form as a flanker, saw Hodgson receive a call up into the Australian under-21s team for the 2002 Under 21 Rugby World Championship. He started in the number 7 jersey in the grand final against South Africa under-21, who were the winning side 24–21 in Johannesburg. He was part of the Eastwood Rugby Club winning side in the 2002 Shute Shield, where he was named man-of-the match in the 19–15 win over Sydney University.

2005 – Debut Super Rugby season
In 2005, Hodgson was a member of the Australian sevens side that finished seventh in the 2004–05 World Sevens Series. In addition to this, he got his first taste of international rugby, playing for the Australian A side against the Junior All Blacks in Canberra. Further more, Hodgson signed with the Western Force, for their inaugural season of Super Rugby. He made his super rugby debut at home, Subiaco Oval, against the Brumbies who were the victors in that match 25–10. At the end of his debut season with the Force, he was awarded the inaugural presentation of the 2006 Force Man award – a recognition given to the player deemed to best represent the club's values in all that they do both on and off the field. This award was again won by Hodgson in 2007, 2009 and in 2010.

2009 – Australia
Hodgson enjoyed a break-out season in 2009, earning his first Western Force Player of the Year award and first Wallabies call up. He debuted for Australia in the non-cap earning 55–7 annihilation of the Barbarians at Sydney Football Stadium. A serious AC Joint injury sustained during the 39th minute sidelined Hodgson for 3 months, but he returned for the Spring Tour later that year and performed in the midweek matches against Gloucester and Cardiff Blues.

2010 Super rugby season saw Hodgson awarded his second Player of the Year award in so many years. Hodgson rounded off 2010 with two Man of the Match performances on Wallaby Spring tour against Munster and Leicester.

Hodgson's first test cap was a substitution from the bench in the 49–3 victory against Fiji in Canberra, during the 2010 mid-year rugby union internationals. He also made appearances from the bench in tests against England, New Zealand and Italy during the 2010 season. He earned his first starting position against Samoa in Sydney during the 2011 mid-year rugby union internationals. On that occasion Samoa won 32–23 in a shock victory.

Hodgson was a member of the 2011 World Cup Squad, called up as an injury replacement for Wycliff Palu.

Hodgson is contracted until the end of the 2015 Super Rugby Season with the Western Force. Hodgson is managed by the Fordham Company in Sydney.

Personal life
In 2009, Hodgson graduated with a Bachelor of Exercise Science & Sports Management from Australian Catholic University. In 2011, he completed a Real Estate Sales Agent course. He was reported to be enrolled in the Masters of Business Management (Sports Law) at Deakin University in December 2011. Hodgson was awarded the 2011 RUPA Academic Award.

Hodgson owns F45 Training West Leederville.  The first F45 Training franchise to open in Western Australia. (Opened 26 May 2014)

Hodgson calls Perth home, is married to Jo Hodgson and father to Hunter Patrick Hodgson (born in 2013).

Super Rugby statistics

References

External links
 Official Website
 Wallabies Player Profile
 Western Force Profile

1981 births
Australian rugby union players
Australia international rugby union players
Western Force players
New South Wales Waratahs players
Male rugby sevens players
Rugby union flankers
Living people
Perth Spirit players
Rugby union players from Sydney